Islampura is a Union Council located in Data Gunj Bakhsh Zone, Lahore, Punjab, Pakistan. It is primarily a residential area located adjacent to the Punjab Secretariat. Its postal code is 54000.

Education

Government Sector Schools

Government boys high school Chishtia
Government boys high school Islamia.
Pakturk marif school islampura

Private Scector Schools

M.D Junior Model and Higher Scenodary School.
Lahore Kids Campus.
John McDonald high school

References

Data Gunj Bakhsh Zone